The Gilchrest Road crossing accident was a grade crossing accident that occurred on March 24, 1972, in the town of Clarkstown, New York, between the hamlets of Valley Cottage and Congers, roughly  northwest of New York City. Five students from Valley Cottage were killed, and 44 others were injured.

The Penn Central (formerly New York Central) railway crossing at Gilchrest Road West, just outside Valley Cottage, contained only crossbucks and lacked additional warning hardware, such as flashing lights, crossing gates or a warning bell. The railway line was also difficult for road vehicles to see due to the curvature of the road and lineside trees.

Accident
On the morning of March 24, 1972, 35-year-old Joseph Larkin was driving Nyack High School GMC H6500 school bus number 596, loaded past capacity, downhill on Gilchrest Road. The bus was filled with 48 passengers, with some left standing due to lack of room. Larkin did not decrease the speed of the bus as he approached the grade crossing. 

The train engineer saw the bus cross the tracks and immediately applied the brakes. However, the train's momentum carried it through the crossing, where it collided with the bus. The freight train ripped through the school bus, severing it into two sections, with the front half coming to rest a quarter mile (1,116 ft) down the tracks. The rear section of the bus was torn loose, and fell off next to the tracks upside down with a number of students still inside, while several other students were ejected from the remaining portion of the bus, passing through separated floor sections and fell between the rails into the path of the train.

Survivor Timothy Wilkins described that, "All of a sudden, someone yelled, 'Train.' I looked up and the train was there. I heard the train brakes and I heard the engine..."

Victims 
Three students, Jimmy McGuiness (17), Richard Macaylo (18), and Bobby Mauterer (14), were killed instantly. Forty-five more students and Larkin were rushed to a nearby hospital, where 14-year-old Thomas Grosse died from his injuries several days later. 16-year-old Stephan Ward died on April 14. Some of the children that survived required artificial limbs. One reporter wrote that in the aftermath the hospital had "...anguished mothers, some still clad in bathrobes, crowded the hospital lobby seeking information on their children." None of the train crew were injured in the accident.

Trial
Larkin was brought to trial and charged with criminally negligent homicide in the death of the five students. He pled not guilty to all charges.  At trial, witnesses testified that Larkin failed to stop the bus before crossing into the train's path, while Larkin testified he neither saw nor heard the train beforehand. Larkin was convicted of criminally negligent homicide and sentenced to five years’ probation; he died in 1998 at the age of 61.

Aftermath 
After the accident there was public outcry and anger against the driver and the fact that there were no warning gates or lights at the crossing. On September 22, 1972, the National Transportation Safety Board directed a recommendation relating to the accident towards the National Highway Traffic Safety Administration. Louis M. Thayer was part of the five member board of the Federal Agency to question witnesses and investigate the accident.

A mass for three students who were killed was held at St. Paul's Roman Catholic Church in Congers. A special interdenominational prayer service for the recovery of the injured was held as part of the Palm Sunday observance at All Saints Protestant Episcopal Church in Valley Cottage.

Because of the accident, the New York State Department of Motor Vehicles established article 19-A, which is a system that all bus drivers must be qualified to drive by completing a certain amount of requirements, which include, biennial medicals (with follow-ups if needed), biennial written or oral tests, biennial road tests, yearly defensive driving tests, yearly license abstracts, and fingerprints with criminal history reviews. Article 19-A was established in 1974, two years after the accident.

See also

1972 in rail transport
1972 in the United States
List of American railroad accidents
List of level crossing accidents
List of rail accidents (1970–79)
1995 Fox River Grove bus–train collision, similar grade-crossing accident in Chicago suburbs where substitute school bus driver lacked familiarity with route.
Blackheath train accident, 2010 crash in South Africa also resulting from school taxi driver's attempt to beat train through crossing

References

 

Railroad crossing accidents in the United States
Bus incidents in the United States
Railway accidents in 1972
1972 road incidents
1972 in New York (state)
Rockland County, New York
Accidents and incidents involving Penn Central
1972 disasters in the United States
Railway accidents and incidents in New York (state)
March 1972 events in the United States